In political science, rollback is the strategy of forcing a change in the major policies of a state, usually by replacing its ruling regime. It contrasts with containment, which means preventing the expansion of that state; and with détente, which means a working relationship with that state. Most of the discussions of rollback in the scholarly literature deal with United States foreign policy toward communist countries during the Cold War. The rollback strategy was tried and was not successful in Korea in 1950 and in Cuba in 1961, but it was successful in Grenada in 1983. The political leadership of the United States discussed the use of rollback during the East German uprising of 1953 and the Hungarian Revolution of 1956, but decided against it to avoid the risk of Soviet intervention or a major war.

Rollback of governments hostile to the U.S. took place in World War II (against Italy 1943, Germany 1945, and Japan 1945), Afghanistan (against the Taliban 2001), and Iraq (against Saddam Hussein 2003). When directed against an established government, rollback is sometimes called "regime change".

Terminology
The term rollback was popularized in the 1940s and the 1950s, but the term is much older. Some Britons, opposed to Russian oppression against Poland, proposed in 1835 a coalition that would be "united to roll back into its congenial steppes and deserts the tide of Russian barbarism." Scottish novelist and military historian John Buchan in 1915 wrote of the American Indian Wars, "I cast back to my memory of the tales of Indian war, and could not believe but that the white man, if warned and armed, would rollback [sic] the Cherokees."

World War II
Rollback includes military operations designed to destroy an enemy's armed forces and occupy its country, as was done in World War II to Italy, Germany, and Japan.

Cold War
The notion of military rollback against the Soviet Union was proposed by conservative strategist James Burnham and other strategists in the late 1940s, and by the Truman Administration against North Korea in the Korean War. Much debated was the question whether the U.S. should pursue a rollback strategy against communism in Eastern Europe in 1953–1956, which the United States ultimately decided against for fear of provoking direct conflict with the Soviet Union.

Instead of overt military rollback, the United States focused primarily on long-term psychological warfare and military or clandestine assistance to delegitimize pro-communist regimes and help insurgents. These attempts began as early as 1945 in Eastern Europe, including efforts to provide weapons to independence fighters in the Baltic states and Ukraine. Another early effort was against Albania in 1949, following the defeat of communist forces in the Greek Civil War that year. In this case, a force of agents was landed by the British and Americans to try to provoke a guerrilla war, but it failed. The operation had already been betrayed to the Soviets by the British double agent Kim Philby, and led to the immediate capture or killing of the agents.

Harry Truman
In the Korean War, the United States and the United Nations officially endorsed a policy of rollback—the destruction of the communist North Korean government—and sent UN forces across the 38th parallel. The strategy caused China to intervene, and U.S. forces were pushed back to the 38th parallel. The failure of complete rollback contributed to the U.S. decision to return to the alternate strategy of containment.

Dwight Eisenhower
After the 1952 presidential election, Republican spokesman John Foster Dulles took the lead in promoting a rollback policy. The 1952 Republican Party's national platform reaffirmed this position, and Dwight D. Eisenhower appointed Dulles as Secretary of State. However, Eisenhower ultimately adopted containment instead of rollback in October 1953 through National Security Council document NSC 162/2, effectively abandoning rollback efforts in Europe.

Eisenhower instead relied on clandestine CIA actions to undermine hostile small governments and used economic and military foreign aid to strengthen governments supporting the American position in the Cold War. In August 1953, the United States, in collaboration with the British SIS, conducted Operation Ajax to assist the Iranian military in the restoration of the Shah. Eisenhower adviser Charles Douglas Jackson also coordinated psychological warfare against communism. Radio Free Europe, a private agency funded by Congress,  broadcast attacks on communism directed at Eastern Europe.

In 1956, Eisenhower decided not to intervene during the Hungarian Revolution of 1956. The Suez Crisis, which unfolded simultaneously, played an important role in hampering the U.S. response to the crisis in Hungary. The Suez Crisis made the condemnation of Soviet actions difficult. As Vice President Richard Nixon later explained: "We couldn't, on one hand, complain about the Soviets intervening in Hungary and, on the other hand, approve of the British and the French picking that particular time to intervene against Gamal Abdel Nasser."

Ronald Reagan

The "rollback" movement gained significant ground in the United States in the 1980s. The Reagan administration, urged on by The Heritage Foundation and other influential conservatives, began to channel weapons to movements such as the Mujahideen in Afghanistan, the Contras in Nicaragua, and others in Angola and Cambodia. The United States launched the successful invasion of Grenada in 1983 to protect American residents and reinstate constitutional government following a coup by what Reagan called "a brutal gang of leftist thugs."  Reagan's interventions came to be known as the Reagan Doctrine.

Critics argued that the Reagan Doctrine led to so-called blowback and an unnecessary intensification of Third World conflict. On the other hand, the Soviet Union eventually had to abandon the Soviet–Afghan War. Jessica Martin writes, "Insofar as rollback is concerned, American support for rebels, especially in Afghanistan, at the time helped to drain Soviet coffers and tax its human resources, contributing to that nation's overall crisis and eventual disintegration."

George H. W. Bush 
After the Iraqi invasion of Kuwait on 2 August 1990, a coalition of Western militaries deployed to protect Kuwait and Saudi Arabia from Ba'athist Iraq. While the Persian Gulf War successfully freed Kuwait, many military leaders and American politicians called for a full invasion of Iraq to replace Iraqi dictator Saddam Hussein and effectively roll back his regime. However, President Bush ultimately decided against a full invasion of Iraq.

Between 1988 and 1991, the fifteen Soviet Socialist Republics declared their laws superior to those of the Soviet Union, and the Soviet Union ceased to exist on December 26, 1991.

War on Terror

George W. Bush 

President George W. Bush's policies were similar to those of his father. Following the September 11 attacks, his administration, along with a NATO coalition, undertook a war in Afghanistan to stop the al-Qaeda terrorist group responsible for the attacks. Bush told Congress:
The Taliban must act and act immediately. They will hand over the terrorists, or they will share in their fate.

Similarly, Bush opposed the regime of Saddam Hussein in Iraq, labeling the regime as part of an "axis of evil", which also included Iran and North Korea. Additionally, the administration claimed to believe Hussein possessed weapons of mass destruction. As a result, in March 2003, the U.S. military invaded Iraq and overthrew Hussein's regime.

Barack Obama 
In September 2014, after ISIL had outraged public opinion by beheading two American journalists and had seized control of large portions of Syria and Iraq against ineffective opposition from American allies, President Barack Obama announced a new objective for a rollback policy in the Middle East.  He announced: 
America will lead a broad coalition to roll back this terrorist threat. Our objective is clear: we will degrade, and ultimately destroy, ISIL through a comprehensive and sustained counter-terrorism strategy."

Donald Trump 
The administration of President Donald Trump continued the Obama administration's policies against ISIL. Iraqi Prime Minister Haider Al-Abadi declared the terrorist group defeated in December 2017, and, while some insurgent resistance continued, US special forces killed ISIL leader Abu Bakr Al-Baghdadi in Syria in October 2019.

References

Further reading

 Bodenheimer, Thomas, and Robert Gould. Rollback!: Right-wing Power in U.S. Foreign Policy (1999), hostile to the strategy
 Borhi, László. "Rollback, Liberation, Containment, or Inaction? U.S. Policy and Eastern Europe in the 1950s." Journal of Cold War Studies 1.3 (1999): 67-110. online

 Bowie, Robert R., and Richard H. Immerman. Waging Peace: How Eisenhower Shaped an Enduring Cold War Strategy (1998).
 Borhi, László. "Rollback, Liberation, Containment, or Inaction?: U.S. Policy and Eastern Europe in the 1950s," Journal of Cold War Studies, Fall 1999, Vol. 1 Issue 3, pp 67–110
 Grose, Peter. Operation Roll Back: America's Secret War behind the Iron Curtain (2000) online review
 Lesh, Bruce. "Limited War or a Rollback of Communism?: Truman, MacArthur, and the Korean Conflict," OAH Magazine of History, Oct 2008, Vol. 22 Issue 4, pp 47–53
 Meese III, Edwin.  "Rollback: Intelligence and the Reagan strategy in the developing world,"  in Peter Schweizer, ed., The Fall of the Berlin Wall (2000), pp 77–86
 .
 .

Primary sources
 .

Cold War terminology
Cold War policies
Foreign policy doctrines of the United States
History of the foreign relations of the United States
Soviet Union–United States relations